North Cornwall is a constituency represented in the House of Commons of the UK Parliament by Scott Mann, a Conservative since the 2015 general election. Like all British constituencies, the seat elects one Member of Parliament (MP) by the first past the post system of election at least every five years. The seat was created in 1918. Since 1950, the constituency has been held by MPs from either the Conservative Party or the Liberal Democrats (including the party's predecessor, the Liberal Party).

History 
This constituency was created under the Representation of the People Act 1918.

With exceptions in 1997 and 2001 the seat's margin of victory has been less than 20% of the vote; it has been consistently fought over between and won by the Conservative Party and the Liberal Democrats's candidate (or predecessor party in the latter case), and can be considered a marginal seat.  In 1997 and 2001 the seat turned out strongly overall for the latter party. However, in the 2019 general election, the Conservatives won a large majority of 28.6% over the Liberal Democrat candidate.

A third-placed (other party) candidate has not polled more in North Cornwall than 16.38%, which took place in 1951.  The seat saw three years of defection of its Liberal MP to join the post-World War II Attlee Ministry however in 2015 saw the lowest share of the Labour Party's vote nationally – reinforcing a consistent result by a great majority supporting left-wing politics to vote for a Liberal and later Liberal Democrat at general elections since the seat's inception.

Boundaries 

1918–1950: The Borough of Launceston, the Urban Districts of Newquay, Padstow, Stratton and Bude, and Wadebridge, the Rural Districts of Calstock, Camelford, Launceston, St Columb Major, and Stratton, and parts of the Rural Districts of Bodmin and Holsworthy (these areas such as Whitstone and Week St Mary were on the Cornish side of the border).

1950–1974: The Borough of Launceston, the Urban Districts of Bude-Stratton, Newquay, and Padstow, the Rural Districts of Camelford, Launceston, and Stratton, and parts of the Rural Districts of St Austell and Wadebridge.

1974–1983: The Borough of Launceston, the Urban Districts of Bude-Stratton and Newquay, the Rural Districts of Camelford, Launceston, and Stratton, and parts of the Rural Districts of St Austell, and Wadebridge and Padstow.

1983–2010: The District of North Cornwall wards of Allan, Altarnun, Bodmin St Mary's, Bodmin St Petroc, Bude and Poughill, Camelford, Grenville, Lanivet, Launceston North, Launceston South, Lesnewth, North Petherwin, Ottery, Padstow and St Merryn, Penfound, Rumford, St Breward, St Endellion, St Minver, St Teath, South Petherwin, Stratton, Tintagel, Trigg, Wadebridge, and Week St Mary, and the Borough of Restormel wards of Edgcumbe, Gannel, Rialton, St Columb, and St Enoder.

2010–present: The District of North Cornwall.

Historically four borough constituencies lay within the boundaries, three of which were abolished as 'rotten boroughs' by the Great Reform Act, 1832:

Bossiney (abolished 1832)
Camelford (abolished 1832)
Launceston (abolished 1885)
Newport (abolished 1832 - settlement now a suburb of Launceston).

Members of Parliament

Elections

Elections in the 2010s

Elections in the 2000s

Elections in the 1990s

Elections in the 1980s

Elections in the 1970s 

 February 1974; new constituency boundaries applied.

Elections in the 1960s

Elections in the 1950s

Elections in the 1940s

Elections in the 1930s 

 Death of Maclean 15 June 1932

Elections in the 1920s

Elections in the 1910s

See also 

 List of parliamentary constituencies in Cornwall

Notes

References

Sources 
 British Parliamentary Election Results 1918-1949, compiled and edited by F.W.S. Craig (Macmillan Press 1977)

Parliamentary constituencies in Cornwall
Constituencies of the Parliament of the United Kingdom established in 1918